Kaskin (also Romanized as Kāskīn) is a village in Bazman Rural District, Bazman District, Iranshahr County, Sistan and Baluchestan Province, Iran. At the 2006 census, its population was 21, in 4 families.

References 

Populated places in Iranshahr County